Frank Cifaldi (born May 22, 1982) is a video game preservationist, historian, and developer.

Cifaldi founded Lost Levels, a website that collected information about unreleased video games, in 2003. This began his career in the video game industry, and after years of writing about and producing games, he founded the Video Game History Foundation in 2016. He is currently the director of the organization, and has assisted in projects including Digital Eclipse's Mega Man Legacy Collection and The Disney Afternoon Collection remasters. He is also known for his extensive personal collection of video game periodicals. Cifaldi has also researched early video game advertising, early Nintendo prototypes, and the official Super Mario Bros. release date. He presented on games preservation at the 2016 Game Developers Conference. Cifaldi is additionally a former features editor of Gamasutra, and a former host of the Retronauts podcast.

References

Further reading

External links 

 

Living people
People in the video game industry
Media historians
American archivists
21st-century American historians
21st-century American male writers
American male non-fiction writers
1982 births